Russell Dickson (born 28 January 1964) is a former Australian rules footballer who played with Collingwood in the Victorian Football League (VFL).

Dickson, a Greensborough recruit, kicked four goals on debut for Collingwood, against North Melbourne at the Melbourne Cricket Ground in the opening round of the 1985 VFL season. It was the first ever Victorian Football League game to be played under lights at the MCG. He played a further ten games that year, six in 1986 and three in 1987.

From 2005 to 2007, Dickson was senior coach of Greensborough. He coached them to the 2006 DVFL Division II premiership.

References

1964 births
Australian rules footballers from Victoria (Australia)
Collingwood Football Club players
Greensborough Football Club players
Greensborough Football Club coaches
Living people